X-ray microtomography, like tomography and X-ray computed tomography, uses X-rays to create cross-sections of a physical object that can be used to recreate a virtual model (3D model) without destroying the original object. The prefix micro- (symbol: µ) is used to indicate that the pixel sizes of the cross-sections are in the micrometre range. These pixel sizes have also resulted in the terms high-resolution X-ray tomography, micro-computed tomography (micro-CT or µCT), and similar terms. Sometimes the terms high-resolution CT (HRCT) and micro-CT are differentiated, but in other cases the term high-resolution micro-CT is used. Virtually all tomography today is computed tomography.

Micro-CT has applications both in medical imaging and in industrial computed tomography. In general, there are two types of scanner setups. In one setup, the X-ray source and detector are typically stationary during the scan while the sample/animal rotates. The second setup, much more like a clinical CT scanner, is gantry based where the animal/specimen is stationary in space while the X-ray tube and detector rotate around. These scanners are typically used for small animals (in vivo scanners), biomedical samples, foods, microfossils, and other studies for which minute detail is desired.

The first X-ray microtomography system was conceived and built by Jim Elliott in the early 1980s. The first published X-ray microtomographic images were reconstructed slices of a small tropical snail, with pixel size about 50 micrometers.

Working principle

Imaging system

Fan beam reconstruction
The fan-beam system is based on a one-dimensional (1D) X-ray detector and an electronic X-ray source, creating 2D cross-sections of the object. Typically used in human computed tomography systems.

Cone beam reconstruction
The cone-beam system is based on a 2D X-ray detector (camera) and an electronic X-ray source, creating projection images that later will be used to reconstruct the image cross-sections.

Open/Closed systems

Open X-ray system
In an open system, X-rays may escape or leak out, thus the operator must stay behind a shield, have special protective clothing, or operate the scanner from a distance or a different room. Typical examples of these scanners are the human versions, or designed for big objects.

Closed X-ray system
In a closed system, X-ray shielding is put around the scanner so the operator can put the scanner on a desk or special table. Although the scanner is shielded, care must be taken and the operator usually carries a dosimeter, since X-rays have a tendency to be absorbed by metal and then re-emitted like an antenna. Although a typical scanner will produce a relatively harmless volume of X-rays, repeated scannings in a short timeframe could pose a danger. Digital detectors with small pixel pitches and micro-focus x-ray tubes are usually employed to yield in high resolution images. 
 
Closed systems tend to become very heavy because lead is used to shield the X-rays. Therefore, the smaller scanners only have a small space for samples.

3D image reconstruction

The principle
Because microtomography scanners offer isotropic, or near isotropic, resolution, display of images does not need to be restricted to the conventional axial images. Instead, it is possible for a software program to build a volume by 'stacking' the individual slices one on top of the other. The program may then display the volume in an alternative manner.

Image reconstruction software
For X-ray microtomography, powerful open source software is available, such as the ASTRA toolbox. The ASTRA Toolbox is a MATLAB and python toolbox of high-performance GPU primitives for 2D and 3D tomography, from 2009–2014 developed by iMinds-Vision Lab, University of Antwerp and since 2014 jointly developed by iMinds-VisionLab, UAntwerpen and CWI, Amsterdam. The toolbox supports parallel, fan, and cone beam, with highly flexible source/detector positioning. A large number of reconstruction algorithms are available, including FBP, ART, SIRT, SART, CGLS.

For 3D visualization, tomviz is a popular open-source tool for tomography.

Volume rendering
Volume rendering is a technique used to display a 2D projection of a 3D discretely sampled data set, as produced by a microtomography scanner. Usually these are acquired in a regular pattern, e.g., one slice every millimeter, and usually have a regular number of image pixels in a regular pattern. This is an example of a regular volumetric grid, with each volume element, or voxel represented by a single value that is obtained by sampling the immediate area surrounding the voxel.

Image segmentation
Where different structures have similar threshold density, it can become impossible to separate them simply by adjusting volume rendering parameters. The solution is called segmentation, a manual or automatic procedure that can remove the unwanted structures from the image.

Typical use

Archaeology
 Reconstructing fire-damaged artifacts, such as the En-Gedi Scroll and Herculaneum papyri
 Unpacking cuneiform tablets wrapped in clay envelopes and clay tokens

Biomedical
 Both in vitro and in vivo small animal imaging
Neurons
 Human skin samples 
 Bone samples, including teeth, ranging in size from rodents to human biopsies
 Lung imaging using respiratory gating
 Cardiovascular imaging using cardiac gating
 Imaging of the human eye, ocular microstructures and tumors
 Tumor imaging (may require contrast agents)
 Soft tissue imaging
 Insects – Insect development
 Parasitology – migration of parasites, parasite morphology
 Tablet consistency checks

Developmental biology

 Tracing the development of the extinct Tasmanian tiger during growth in the pouch
 Model and non-model organisms (elephants, zebrafish, and whales)

Electronics
 Small electronic components. E.g. DRAM IC in plastic case.

Microdevices
 Spray nozzle

Composite materials and metallic foams
 Ceramics and Ceramic–Metal composites. Microstructural analysis and failure investigation
 Composite material with glass fibers 10 to 12 micrometres in diameter

Polymers, plastics
 Plastic foam

Diamonds
 Detecting defects in a diamond and finding the best way to cut it.

Food and seeds
 3-D imaging of foods using X-ray microtomography
Analysing heat and drought stress on food crops

Wood and paper
 Piece of wood to visualize year periodicity and cell structure

Building materials
 Concrete after loading

Geology
In geology it is used to analyze micro pores in the reservoir rocks, it can used in microfacies analysis for sequence stratigraphy. In petroleum exploration it is used to model the petroleum flow under micro pores and nano particles.

It can give a resolution up to 1 nm.

 Sandstone
 Porosity and flow studies

Fossils
 Vertebrates
 Invertebrates

Microfossils

 Benthonic foraminifers

Palaeography
 Digitally unfolding letters of correspondence which employed letterlocking.

Space
 Locating stardust-like particles in aerogel using X-ray techniques
 Samples returned from asteroid 25143 Itokawa by the Hayabusa mission

Stereo images
 Visualizing with blue and green or blue filters to see depth

Others
 Cigarettes
Social insect nests

See also 
 Synchrotron
 Mind uploading

References

External links 

MicroComputed Tomography: Methodology and Applications
Synchrotron and non synchrotron X-ray microtomography threedimensional representation of bone ingrowth in calcium phosphate biomaterials
Microfocus X-ray Computer Tomography in Materials Research
Locating Stardust-like particles in aerogel using x-ray techniques
Use of micro CT to study kidney stones
Use of micro CT in ophthalmology
Application of the Gatan X-ray Ultramicroscope (XuM) to the Investigation of Material and Biological Samples 
3D Synchrotron X-ray microtomography of paint samples

Medical imaging
Materials science
Microtomography
Microtechnology
X-ray computed tomography
Articles containing video clips